is a Japanese actor and voice actor from Yokohama, Kanagawa Prefecture.

Biography

He was a narrator in Nagoya including documentary programs and CM narration since the late 1990s. Aiming to be a voice actor in 2003, he entered a professional class of "picture techno academia" managed by Tohokushinsha, Tokyo. In October of the same year he started at the Office Osawa. He registered in 2004 and started as a voice actor. He has done CM narration for each company since the BMW 3 series "Walnut split crows" (works selected for the 15th brand of the year 2006). In 2010, he participated in the narration · battle · live "Oh chew end!" in Osaka and won the race. From October 2013, he was in charge of the narration of the 365-day daily changing commercial (KIRIN "Fire") which is the first in CM history. In September 2014, he appeared in BMW's TVCM "Clean Diesel Story". In the same month, at the Shinjuku Golden Town Theater, he performed a guest appearance at the comedy play of "Nemikuji Theater Live 2" presided over by Across entertainment, and first showed the voice managers of the dimension Daisuke his talent. In September 2015, in Nakameguro TRY, he appeared at "The Lame 3 Theme".

Filmography

Anime
2005
Cluster Edge – Boy Cho
Hell Girl – Master of a Coffee Shop
Naruto – Gamaken, Gengo, Gozu
Yakitate!! Japan – Monica Adenauer's father
2006
RGB Adventure – Largo
Aria – The Natural – Master
Witchblade – doctor, caster
Ouran High School Host Club – Aijima
Glass Fleet – Eckhardt
Gintama – Oden's father, deputy director Meguro, father of a bar
The Story of Saiunkoku – old official
Shakugan no Shana – Orgon
Zegapain – Insel
Marginal Prince – Colonel
2007
Shining Tears X Wind – Jin-Crow
Guardian of the Sacred Spirit – Emperor, Rai
Nodame Cantabile – Kai Dunn
Bakugan Battle Brawlers – Tigres, Kyosuke Marukura
Baccano! – Denkurō Tōgō
Bokurano: Ours – Katsuragi
Myself; Yourself – language teacher
2008
The Diary of a Crazed Family – Gen'ichirō Hanayama
Soul Eater – Joe Buttataki
Tytania – Michael Valenkov
Tales of the Abyss – Goldberg
Birdy the Mighty Decode – Geega
Astro Fighter Sunred – Narration, Armor Tiger, Hell Wolf, Taiza, Dolgon
Blassreiter – Victor Stachus
Legends of the Dark King: A Fist of the North Star Story – Narrator, Ryūken
Ryoko's Case File – Masamoto Yakushiji

2009
Sweet Blue Flowers – Yasuko's father
Canaan – Kenji Ōsawa
Queen's Blade: The Exiled Virgin – Count Vance
Queen's Blade 2: The Evil Eye – Count Vance
Guin Saga – Saiden
Valkyria Chronicles – Narrator
Natsume's Book of Friends – Three-eyed Youkai
Birdy the Mighty Decode:02 – Gatol
Astro Fighter Sunred – Narration, Armor Tiger, Hell Wolf, Taiza, Dolgon
Naruto – Gamaken, Gengo, Gozu
Nyan Koi! – principal
Basquash! – Robert Gambeat, audience

2010
Demon King Daimao – Yōzō Hattori
The Betrayal Knows My Name – police commissioner
Maiden Spirit Zakuro – Moritomi Agemaki
Angel Beats! – vice principal
Ōkami-san & her Seven Companions – Ranpu Aragami
The Qwaser of Stigmata – Yuudai Yamanobe
Nura: Rise of the Yokai Clan – Tearai Oni
Bakugan Battle Brawlers New Vestroia – Tigres, Berius
Heroman – police officer A, senior official A
2011
Kamisama Dolls – Shingo Shiba
Suite Precure – Bassdrum
The Blooming Colors – Tetsuo Isami
Freezing – Gengo Aoi
Bleach – Giriko Kutsuzawa
Persona 4: The Animation – principal
Ben-To – Kenji Dandō
2012
World War Blue – Marcus
Amagami SS+ plus – truck driver
Code: Breaker – Kumichou Nitta
Humanity Has Declined – caravan captain
Muv-Luv Alternative: Total Eclipse – Jerzy Sandek
Bodacious Space Pirates – Yotof Sif Sideux
Lagrange: The Flower of Rin-ne – Saruema
2013
Arpeggio of Blue Steel – Ryōkan Kita
The Eccentric Family – Ebisu
The Pet Girl of Sakurasou – company president
Gargantia on the Verdurous Planet – Commander
Devil Survivor 2: The Animation – Byakko
The Devil is a Part-Timer! – Nord Justina
Freezing Vibration – Gengo Aoi
Unbreakable Machine-Doll – Edward Rutherford
Yozakura Quartet – mysterious man
2014
If Her Flag Breaks – Eria Bladefield
Captain Earth – Mr. Bow
Argevollen – Arnold Holmes
White Box – Hirokazu Wakabashira
Bladedance of Elementalers – Duke Cygnus Fahrengart
Marvel Disk Wars: The Avengers – World Security Council B
Dragon Collection – Co Uta Mara
Hamatora – master
Re: Hamatora – master
Barakamon – Iwao Yamamura
The Irregular at Magic High School – Chen Xiangshan
2015
The Heroic Legend of Arslan – Montferrat
Mobile Suit Gundam: Iron-Blooded Orphans – Nady Yukinojo Kassapa
Gate – Molt Sol Augustus
Blood Blockade Battlefront – Landlord
Shimoneta: A Boring World Where the Concept of Dirty Jokes Doesn't Exist – Zenjurô Okuma
Charlotte – big name producer
Unlimited Fafnir – Major General Dylan
Is It Wrong to Try to Pick Up Girls in a Dungeon? – Bell's grandfather
Heavy Object – Captain
Chivalry of a Failed Knight – Kaito Ayatsuji
Rampo Kitan: Game of Laplace – slave B, scholar, old man
2016
Active Raid – superior officer
The Heroic Legend of Arslan: Dust Storm Dance – Montferrat
Kuromukuro – Lefil
Hip Whip Girl – Musou Miyata
Undefeated Bahamut Chronicle – Deputy Commander Baltshift
Descending Stories: Showa Genroku Rakugo Shinju – Master Kouma
Flip Flappers – head priest
Bungo Stray Dogs – Ryuurou Hirotsu
Magi: Adventure of Sinbad – Prime Minister
Case Closed – Teruhiko Motoi
Regalia: The Three Sacred Stars – Abel Lundestad
2017
Altair: A Record of Battles  – Emperor Goldbalt XI
Saga of Tanya the Evil – Olvajoule Kazole
Chain Chronicle: The Light of Haecceitas – Kalifa
Sakura Quest – Ushimatsu Kadota
Re:Creators – Blitz Talker
The Eccentric Family – Ebisu
Magical Circle Guru Guru – King Uruga XIII
Infini-T Force – Z
2018
That Time I Got Reincarnated as a Slime – Kaijin
2019
One-Punch Man 2 – Monster King Orochi
Vinland Saga – Floki
Cautious Hero: The Hero Is Overpowered but Overly Cautious – Cerceus
2020
Great Pretender – Eddie Cassano
2022
My Dress-Up Darling – Kaoru Gojo
Delicious Party Pretty Cure – Koshinosuke Hanamichi
Mobile Suit Gundam: The Witch from Mercury Prologue – Sarius Zenelli

Dubbing

Live-action
His Dark Materials – Father MacPhail (Will Keen)

Animation
DC League of Super-Pets – Jor-El
The Grim Adventures of Billy & Mandy – Dracula

References

External links
 Official agency profile 
 
 

1961 births
Living people
Japanese male video game actors
Japanese male voice actors
Male voice actors from Yokohama
Across Entertainment voice actors